Andrew Philp was a Scotland international rugby union player.

Rugby Union career

Amateur career

He played for Edinburgh Institution F.P.

Provincial career

He played for Edinburgh District in the 1881 inter-city match.

He played for East of Scotland District in the 18 January 1882 match against West of Scotland District.

International career

He was capped once for Scotland, in 1882.

Family

He was born to Andrew Philp and Eliza Miller. He had 3 brothers - James, William, and David - and 3 sisters - Margaret, Helen and Eliza Ann. Andrew was the second youngest.

References

1859 births
1937 deaths
Scottish rugby union players
Scotland international rugby union players
Edinburgh Institution F.P. players
Edinburgh District (rugby union) players
East of Scotland District players
Rugby union players from Edinburgh
Rugby union centres